The reflective transformative design process (RTDP) is a design method developed at Eindhoven University of technology department of Industrial design and proposes a more dynamic, and open design process compared to the more classical double diamond design process. Where the focus is on transforming society through design by continuously reflecting on your vision and the impact that the design will have. The sequence of the design path is not fixed, the focus is on reflection on the process and the result after each activity. It has overlap with the Lean startup method, in a way that it describes a cyclic, continuous process. It also has overlap with Action research, where research is done by actively participating in the research, in the case of RTDP the designer's artifact is participating in the context.

Elements of Reflective transformative design 
The main element of RTDP is ideating integrating, realizing which contains methods like prototyping, wizzard of ozz, sketching

 Envisioning/transforming: Storytelling
 Analyzing/Abstracting: Mapping, Systems theory
 Validating Quality: This category is related to user-testing or making a Minimum viable product
 Sensing perceiving doing: Workmanship, hacking

The process is defined as a path though these actions, where the designer reflects on whether the design process is leading towards the envisioned goal.

References 

Industrial design